Art as a factor in the soul's evolution is a book written by Curuppumullage Jinarajadasa and was first published in 1915. It is based on a theosophical framework and describes how humans evolve through art. Following the publication of this book, Jinarajadasa held important positions in the Theosophical Society and greatly contributed to the spreading of theosophical ideas through his writings. He even won the Subba Row Medal, which is granted to writers who significantly contributed to theosophical literature, in 1913.

Context 
Jinarajadasa lived in Sri Lanka and was raised by Buddhist parents until, at the age of thirteen, he met the theosophical worker Charles Leadbeater who traveled there for Buddhist education. Leadbeater, who was a member of the Theosophical Society (TS) was looking for a boy reincarnating his brother who had been killed years earlier. He recognized his brother in the young Jinarajadasa and convinced him to follow him to England by saying that Jinarajadasa's karma required him to do so. Since Jinarajadasa's parents were opposed to their son leaving, Leadbeater secretly planned an escape for the young boy. That escape failed but the parents eventually gave their son permission to leave and thus Leadbeater took him to England where he offered him a private theosophical education. Jinarajadasa stayed in England for 15 years. Two years after returning to Sri Lanka, the author joined the Theosophical Society Adyar in 1903. His book "Art as a factor in the soul's evolution" was first presented in an exhibition of art in 1905. The occasion of this exhibition was the second Annual Congress of the Federation of European Branches of the Theosophical Society in London.  Being in America at that time, the author did not attend the exhibition. In this period Jinarajadasa was already working for the Theosophical Society which is reflected in his literature. The author published "Art as a factor in the soul's evolution" as a book in 1915.

Jinarajadasa appreciated art and advocated the ideal of beauty in speech and writing. He believed in a universal law that precedes and predicts nature. According to him, this law is subject to art and not any domain like physics or chemistry. The author held the opinion that the creation of art is essential in attaining Nirvana. He states that every student of the School of Wisdom, a school for members of the Theosophical Society, should be taught forms of art such as painting and poetry. By acquiring these skills, the students recreate the objective world and are able to take part in it. Jinarajadasa sees art as a means to see the goals of things, offering inside information that explains complicated problems. He wrote "Art as a factor in the soul's evolution" as a pamphlet. Pamphlets were used to arouse interest in the Theosophical movement.

The book deals with theosophy, a belief system that supposes that there is a state of consciousness that shows the ultimate truth of the universe. Back when the term ‘theosophy’ was first used during the 3rd to the 6th century, it described a process by which knowledge could be derived spiritually and not through intellect. This is also reflected in "Art as a factor in the soul's evolution". In 1875 a new theosophical movement began with the Theosophical Society being founded. Three years later the society moved to India where Adyar became the new headquarter and where Jinarajadasa joined the Theosophical Society.

Content 
In "Art as a factor in the soul's evolution" Jinarajadasa explains what theosophy is and how its basic principles relate to intelligence and intuition. He concludes by explaining how art, as a form of intuition, can contribute to embodying the divine plan, which is one of the basic ideas of theosophy. Having a theosophical worldview allows humans to look at themselves and the universe from the point of view of God. Jinarajadasa states that the true meaning of life can be derived through theosophy. God, as the consciousness behind all things, has a divine plan that nature will reach through the process of evolution.According to the author, wisdom and mind can be equated to intuition and intelligence respectively, and are drivers for evolution. The human mind analyses facts and derives conclusions from them. These conclusions become generalizations and can be seen as archetypal ideas of the divine plan. Humans gain intelligence through this process. Human intuition is a stronger force of evolution than intelligence. It generalizes from within and every human possesses it, even if it is sometimes hidden. Art can be used as a means to put humans into touch with archetypal concepts through their intuition.

Art shows humans how to look at themselves and the world from God's point of view. It shows everything in their true relations and archetypal concepts. Drama and music are the highest forms of art. In drama, archetypes are materialized and performed live, which allows humans to anticipate experiences. Music directly represents the archetypes.

Reception 
After writing "Art as a factor of the soul's evolution", Jinarajadasa proceeded to work for the Theosophical Society. He started giving Convention lectures at Adyar in 1914, which is one of his duties as a theosophist and continued doing so until the end of his life. The then President of the Theosophical Society Annie Besant requested Jinarajadasa to go to Italy for theosophical work. After returning from Italy, Jinarajadasa held many different positions in the Theosophical Society and finally took office as the President of the Theosophical Society on February 17, 1946. His many publications and his work for the society made the author a valuable member of the Theosophical Society and he greatly contributed to the proliferation of theosophy. Jinarajadasa worked as an editor for The Theosophist, the official magazine of the Theosophical Society and thus further spreading theosophical ideas during different periods of his life.

Jinarajadasa wrote multiple books after "Art as a factor in the soul's evolution" and most of them deal with theosophy as well such as "Theosophy and Modern Thought" (1914) and  "First Principles of Theosophy" (1921). All of his books were published by the Theosophical Publishing House, Adyar.

The book "Art as a factor in the soul's evolution" is part of the special collection of Maastricht University.

References 

1915 non-fiction books
Theosophy